MV Apollo was a vehicle/passenger ferry that previously serviced the route between St. Barbe, Newfoundland and Labrador and Blanc-Sablon, Quebec, Canada.

History

Apollo was originally built for Rederi Ab Slite of Sweden in 1970. She was put into service for Viking Line from Kapellskär, Sweden, to Naantali, Finland, via Mariehamn on Åland. In 1975 the route was changed to Stockholm–Mariehamn. In 1976, she was sold to Olau Line for its service between Sheerness, England, and Vlissingen, Netherlands, and was renamed Olau Kent, before returning to Scandinavia in 1981 as the Gelting Nord of Danish operator Nordisk Færgefart.  In 1984, she was chartered to Brittany Ferries as the Benodet, before moving to sister company British Channel Island Ferries in 1985 as the Corbière.  In the early 1990s, she was sold to Rederi Ab Eckerö and moved back to the Baltic Sea serving between Helsinki and Tallinn, first for Tallink, under the marketing name Linda 1, and from 1995 for Eckerö Line and reverting to its original name of Apollo.  After some further charters in the late 1990s, in 2000 Apollo was sold to the Woodward Group of Newfoundland and Labrador, Canada, entering service with its Labrador Marine subsidiary.

Service with Labrador Marine

Apollo typically operated across the Strait of Belle Isle between St. Barbe, on the island of Newfoundland and Blanc-Sablon, Quebec, close to the border with Labrador.  Winter ice conditions sometimes prevent Apollo from entering the harbour at St. Barbe, and service is provided from the Newfoundland port of Corner Brook instead, resulting in a crossing time of 12 hours rather than 1 hour 45 minutes.

In January 2008, Apollo suffered a minor engine room fire.

On 13 April 2017, Apollo became stuck in ice in the Strait of Belle Isle near Blanc-Sablon, Quebec for nearly 30 hours with 70 passengers on board. The Canadian Coast Guard vessel  was sent to aid the ferry and escorted Apollo to port once it was free of the ice. Sailings were cancelled on 14 April, but the vessel returned to normal service following the incident. On 19–20 April, all sailings by the ferry were cancelled due to severe ice conditions in the strait.

In February 2019 the ship crashed into the landing dock in Godbout, Quebec, tearing a hole in the ship's bow. It crashed again the following month at a wharf across the river in Matane, Quebec. It was permanently removed from service after the two crashes. Plans were established to sink the vessel to create an underwater diving attraction, but asbestos was discovered on the ship and the project proved impractical. In October 2019, while the ship was costing $30,000 per month to keep the ship docked at a facility in Quebec City, it was announced that the vessel would be scrapped. , formerly MV Grete, replaced Apollo on the Strait of Belle Isle crossing in late 2019.
Apollo was finally scrapped in September 2021 at Aliaga in Turkey.

References

External links
 Labrador Marine (Woodward Group)

Ferries
1969 ships